Øyvind Ruud (30 December 1944 – 20 February 2015) was a Norwegian politician for the Christian Democratic Party.

He served as a deputy representative to the Parliament of Norway from Akershus during the term 1993–1997. He most notably was the county mayor of Akershus from 1988 to 1991.

References

1944 births
2015 deaths
People from Skedsmo
Deputy members of the Storting
Christian Democratic Party (Norway) politicians
Akershus politicians
Chairmen of County Councils of Norway
Place of birth missing